The West African Examinations Council (WAEC) is an examination board established by law to determine the examinations required in the public interest in the English-speaking West African countries, to conduct the examinations and to award certificates comparable to those of equivalent examining authorities internationally. Established in 1952, the council has contributed to education in Anglophone countries of West Africa (Ghana, Nigeria, Sierra Leone, Liberia, and the Gambia), with the number of examinations they have coordinated, and certificates they have issued. They also formed an endowment fund, to contribute to the education in West Africa, through lectures, and aid to those who cannot afford education. Since established it continues to be one of the biggest and most globally recognized exams in West Africa.

Dr. Adeyegbe, former HNO of WAEC Nigeria (2004) said "the council has developed a team of well-trained and highly motivated staff, and has administered Examinations that are valid and relevant to the educational aspirations of member countries". In a year, over three million candidates registered for the exams coordinated by WAEC. The council also helps other examination bodies (both local and international) in coordinating Examinations.

History
The University of Cambridge Local Examinations Syndicate, University of London School Examinations Matriculation Council and West African Departments of Education met in 1948, concerning education in West Africa.
The meeting was called to discuss the future policy of education in West Africa. At the meeting, they appointed Dr. George Barker Jeffery (Director of the University Of London Institute Of Education) to visit some West African countries, so as to see the general education level and requirements in West Africa. At the end of Jeffery's three-month visit (December 1949 – March 1950) to Ghana, the Gambia, Sierra Leone, and Nigeria, he tendered a report (since known as Jeffery report) strongly supporting the need for a West African Examination Council, and making detailed recommendations on the composition and duties of the council. Following this report, the groups met with the governments of these countries, and they agreed on establishing a West African Examination Council, fully adopting Jeffery's recommendations.

The Establishment of the Council
The legislative assemblies of Nigeria, Ghana, Sierra Leone, and the Gambia passed an ordinance (West African Examinations Council Ordinance NO. 40) approving the West African Examination Council in December 1951. The Ordinance agreed to the coordination of exams, and issuing of certificates to students in individual countries by the West African Examination Council. Liberia later issued their ordinance in 1974, at the annual meeting held in Lagos, Nigeria. After the success of forming an examination council, the council called a first meeting in Accra, Ghana in March 1953. In the meeting, the registrar briefed everybody about the progress of the council. In that same meeting, five committees were formed to assist the council. These committees are: Administrative and Finance Committee, School Examinations Committee, Public Service Examinations Committee, The Professional, Technical and Commercial Examinations Committee, and the Local Committee. The total number of people present for this meeting was 26.

Attendance of first meeting
Below is the list of people who were present during the first meeting held by the West African Examination Council.
 Mr. A. N Galsworthy (Chairman of the council)
 George Barker Jeffery (Chief Secretary of the West African Inter-Territorial Secretariat)
 Mr. J. L. Brereton (Secretary of the Cambridge Syndicate)
 13 members nominated by the governments of Nigeria, Ghana, Sierra Leone, and the Gambia.
 10 Observers, one of whom was Constance Rulka, who would later become the Chief Examiner, and, appointed Assistant Registrar of the West African Examinations Council, and put in charge of examinations in English at all levels in Nigeria, Ghana, Sierra Leone and the Gambia.

50th birthday celebration
In March 2002, the Council celebrated their 50th anniversary in Abuja, Nigeria. The theme of the Anniversary was "WAEC: 50 years of Excellence". All member countries joined in the celebration in their respective countries, apart from the general celebration in Abuja, Nigeria. During this anniversary the book, "The West African Examinations Council (1952-2002): Half a century of Commitment to Excellence and Regional Cooperation", was launched.

Structure of the Council
The West African Examination Council is known to have a strong committee. The structure of the council is divided into three major parts: International committees, National Committees, and Subcommittees.

The International Committee treat matters affecting all member countries and also harmonizes national views pertaining to policies of the council as a whole. The National committees handle matters relating to specific member countries. It also assists in the articulation of national views on issues affecting the policy of the council as a whole. The subcommittees work on various aspects of the council's activities. The Finance committee, for example, is in charge of WAEC's financial status. There are many subcommittees, and they assist both the International and National committees.

Examinations conducted
The council conducts four different categories of examinations. They are International Examinations, National Examinations, Examinations conducted in collaboration with other examining bodies, and Examinations conducted on behalf of other examining bodies. The International exams are exams taken in the five countries with the WAEC ordinance. It consists of:
WASSCE (West African Senior School Certificate Examination):
 WASSCE FOR PRIVATE CANDIDATES (FIRST SERIES) JANUARY–FEBRUARY
 WASSCE FOR (SCHOOL CANDIDATES) MARCH - MAY
 WASSCE FOR PRIVATE CANDIDATES (MAIN GCE) SEPTEMBER–OCTOBER

The National examinations are taken in individual countries. They include:
 the Junior Secondary School Certificate for Nigeria and the Gambia,
 Junior and Senior High School Certificate Examinations for Liberia,
 National Primary School and Basic Education Certificate Examinations for Sierra Leone,
 Basic Education Certificate Examinations for Ghana, and
 Senior School Certificate Examinations for Ghana.

The council also coordinates examinations in collaboration with some trustworthy examination bodies. These include:
 City and Guilds of London Institute
 Royal Society of Arts
 WAEC Research Institute

The council also conducts examination in West Africa on behalf of international examination bodies. These include:
 University of London GCE
 Scholastic Aptitude Test and Graduate Record Examinations for Educational Testing Service, Princeton, USA, and
 JAMB (Joint Admissions and Matriculations Board) examination in countries outside Nigeria.

The council issues credible and reliable certificates to candidates that participate in the Examinations. And the standard of this certificates matches with that of the United Kingdom. This is because the WAEC Ordinance empowered the council to conduct Examinations and award certificates, provided the certificates don't have a lower standard compared to their equivalent certificates of examining authorities in the United Kingdom.

Lectures given
The Endowment fund started giving lectures in March 1996. At the 30th anniversary in 1982, the endowment fund was inaugurated with the aim of promoting educational developments that are geared at improving education at international levels and also giving of prizes to overall outstanding candidates during the examminations. Below are the lectures and the names of the speakers.

 1996 - "The Role of WAEC in the Promotion of Democracy, Sustainable Development and International Cooperation in West Africa" by Prof. E. A. Boateng of Ghana.
 1997 - "The Dual Mandate: Teaching and Examining" by Prof. Eldred Jones of Sierra Leone.
 1998 - "Not in Our Stars" by Prof. V. Chukwuemeka Ike of Nigeria.
 1999 - "And Miles to Go Before I Sleep" by Dr. Lenrie Peters of the Gambia.
 2000 - "Encourage the Best, Support the Rest" by Mr. Moore T. Worrel of Liberia.
 2001 - "The Language Factor in Education- Teaching, Learning and Examining" by Prof. Florence A. Dolphyne of Ghana.
 2002 - "Education for National Redemption" by Prof. J. A. Ayoade of Nigeria.
 2003 - "The Role and Relevance of the West African Examinations Council within the Context of the Realities and Challenges of our Times" by Dr. M. B. Joof of the Gambia.
 2004 - "Developing and Strengthening a Sustainable Modern Science and Technology Human Resource Base and Culture in West Africa" by Prof. Ernest H. M. Wright.
 2005 - "Taking Stock of the Remnants after the Years of the Locust" by Monsignor Dr. Robert G. Tikpor
 2006 - "Quality Assurance in Public Examinations" by Prof. Ivan Addae-Mensah
 2007 - "The Teacher in Leadership" by Prof. I.E.Nwana
 2008 - "Enhanced Agricultural Education: An Inevitable Necessity for our Survival" by Rt. Rev. Dr.S. Tilewa Johnson
 2009 - "Globalization and the Challenges for Education in a Post-Conflict Situation: A Sierra Leone Perspective" by Prof. Abdullah A. Mansaray
 2010 - "The West African Examinations Council: Pan-Africanism, Gender and Development" by Dr. Evelyn S. Kandakai
 2011 - "Towards Excellence in the Teaching and Learning of the Language of Science" by Prof. D. A. Akyeampong
 2012 - "Nipping Educational Failure in the Bud" by Prof. Pius Augustine Ike Obanya
 2013 - "Rethinking Teaching, Learning and Examining for Quality Enhancement in Sub-Saharan Africa: The Roles, Challenges and Prospects of Digital Technologies" by Prof. Mohammadou M. O. Kah
 2014 - "Last to be Hired, First to be Fired: Addressing the Challenges of Teacher Management in the Provision of Quality Education in Sierra Leone" by Prof. E. J. D. Thompson
 2015 - "What Else Are We Writing on the Slate: A Holistic Preparation of the Youth" by Hon. Augustine Kpehe Ngafuan, Minister of Foreign Affairs, Republic of Liberia
 2016 - "Performance in Mathematics and Science: Breaking the Jinx" - by Prof. Jonathan A. Fletcher
 2017 - "Revamping Academic Achievement of Secondary School Students: The Pivotal Role of WAEC from a Nigerian Perspective" by Prof. Amos Shaibu
 2018 - "Development Partners/Government Partnership in Education Sector Financing: Perspective Roles, Opportunities and Responsibilities in the Identification of Needed Improvement Interventions, the Eventual Design of Related Projects and the Provisions for Effective Implementation" by Dr. Baboucarr S. Sarr
2019 - "Innovative Approaches to Measuring Knowledge, Skills and Attitudes of Students" by Prof. Joe A. D. Dean, School of Postgraduate Studies, University of Sierra Leone.
2020 - "Treading on Slippery Ground: Calling Education to Account." by Prof. Kafui Etsey of the Department of Education and Psychology, University of Cape Coast, Ghana.

Vision of the Council

To be a world-class examining body, adding value to the educational goals of its stakeholders.

The council current chairman is Professor, Ato Essuman who was elected during the 69th meeting of the council which held virtually from March 22–26, 2021. Professor Ato Essuman is Ghanaian.

Mission of the Council
Generally, the Council have several missions, most of which is to maintain the standard they have achieved. The Missions of the West African Examination Council are:
 To maintain internationally accepted procedures
 To keep providing qualitative and reliable educational assessment
 To keep promoting sustainable human resources development, mutual understanding and international cooperation.

Heads of Office

 The Gambia: Mr. Odukoya Victor Opeyemi, B.Sc., Ed; M.Ed. (Eval.) Ag. Head of National Office.
 Liberia: Mr. Amah Emmanuel, B.Sc., M.Sc., M.A. Head of National Office.
 Ghana: Mrs. Wendy Addy-Lamptey B.Sc. (Hons); Dip (Ed); M. A. (Meas&Eval); PGD (Pub. Admin)
 Nigeria: Mr. Williams Joshua O. B.Sc., M.Sc., Head of National Office
 Sierra Leone: Mr. Okonkwo Chisom Vincent, B.A. (Ed), M.Ed. Head of National Office.

Issues
There have been some concerns about the efficiency of WAEC as a body. An important episode was an examination leakage scandal in the 1970s, called the Owosho scandal. The scandal was a result of leakage of examination answer slips to students by an official prior to the conduct of the exam. This led to the cancellation of results in some examination centers and some students were asked to take the exam with their juniors the following year. Also in 1977, there was a much wider examination of leakage and malpractice at examination centers which led to what was termed EXPO 77.

By 1982, there were allegations that exams were sold and to combat these types of malpractices, examinations were cancelled at some centers affecting both innocent and guilty students.

The organisation as a whole has failed to keep a rigorous and challenging curriculum. In 2019, WAEC still offers students the option to study subjects like short hand . A tool which was used by secretaries in the 1950s and has fallen out of style in the modern age of computers. One may argue that the lack of an efficient examination body is one of the reasons why the performance of youth in west African countries pale in comparison to western and sub continental counterparts. The fact that the syllabus still remains what it was when the organisation was first founded is proof of the lack of an effective body.

On August 16, 2020, a day before the commencement of WASSCE, there was an alleged circulation of the mathematics paper scheduled for August 17 on social media. However, the council swiftly debunked the reports, described them as fake, and typical of scammers every other examination year. In an interview with the News Agency of Nigeria, Mr Patrick Areghan, WAEC Head of National Office reacted to the reports widely circulated on social media, saying it was " false, malicious, misleading and wicked".

See also
 WASSCE
 NECO

References

External links
Official Website
WAEC Nigeria Website
WAEC Result Checker
WAEC Timetable

Educational institutions established in 1951
Educational organizations based in Africa
Qualifications awarding bodies
School examinations
1951 establishments in the British Empire
Secondary school qualifications